United Nations Security Council resolution 515, adopted on 29 July 1982, after recalling resolutions 512 (1982), 513 (1982) and the Geneva Conventions, the Council demanded that Israel lift the blockade on Beirut, the capital city of Lebanon, to allow urgent aid to the civilian population there. It also requested the Secretary-General to transmit the text of the resolution to the Government of Israel and to monitor the implementation of Resolution 515.

The resolution passed with 14 votes to none; the United States did not participate in the voting. Israel did not implement the resolution.

See also
 1982 Lebanon War
 Blue Line
 Green Line, Beirut
 Israeli–Lebanese conflict
 List of United Nations Security Council Resolutions 501 to 600 (1982–1987)
 Siege of Beirut

References

External links
 
Text of the Resolution at undocs.org

 0515
Israeli–Lebanese conflict
 0515
1982 in Israel
1982 in Lebanon
 0515
July 1982 events